Kurt-Caesar Hoffmann (26 August 1895 – 19 May 1988) was a senior naval commander in the German Navy (Kriegsmarine) during World War II, who commanded the battleship . He was a recipient of the Knight's Cross of the Iron Cross.

Career
Hoffmann joined the military service of the Kaiserliche Marine (Imperial Navy) on 1 April 1912 as a Seekadett (midshipman) and took his first ship training on the cruiser . On 1 April 1913 he underwent further training at the Naval Academy Mürwik, and on 12 April 1913 was promoted to Fähnrich zur See (ensign at sea).

He relinquished command of the Coastal Artillery School and was appointed commander of the light cruiser  on 27 June 1939. After the outbreak of World War II, he initially remained in command of Königsberg. On 21 September 1939, he took over command from Kapitän zur See Otto Ciliax of the battleship Scharnhorst. Scharnhorsts first operation began on 21 November 1939, and lasted until 27 November 1939. Accompanied by her sister , the light cruiser , and nine destroyers, Scharnhorst patrolled the area between Iceland and the Faroe Islands. The intent of the operation was to draw out British units and ease the pressure on the heavy cruiser , which was being pursued in the South Atlantic. Two days later, the German flotilla, under the command of Admiral Wilhelm Marschall aboard Gneisenau, intercepted the auxiliary cruiser . At 16:07, lookouts aboard Scharnhorst spotted the British vessel, and less than an hour later Scharnhorst had closed the range. At 17:03, Scharnhorst opened fire, and three minutes later a salvo of her 28 cm guns hit Rawalpindis bridge, killing the captain and the majority of the staff. During the brief engagement, Rawalpindi managed to score a hit on Scharnhorst, which caused minor splinter damage. Rawalpindi was sunk within 40 minutes.

After this, Hoffmann remained at the helm of the Scharnhorst until after the "Channel Dash" in February 1942, thus captaining the ship through Operation Weserübung, Operation Juno, and Operation Berlin.

On 28 March 1942, Hoffmann became the commanding admiral of the German Navy in the Baltic and was promoted to Konteradmiral on 1 April. From 1 July 1942 until 4 March 1943,  he was the commanding naval officer of the German Navy in the Netherlands. On being promoted to Vizeadmiral on 1 April 1943, Hoffmann became the head of department for artillery development and construction in the naval armaments office of the German Navy.

On 23 May 1945, after the collapse of Germany, Hoffmann was arrested by British forces, but released on 20 February 1947.

Hoffmann joined the newly formed West German Navy (Marine), and from 26 June 1956 to 31 August 1957,  was first deputy head of the Maritime Office Hamburg, thereafter head of administration until his retirement on 31 March 1965.

Awards
 Iron Cross (1914)
 2nd Class (1 August 1916)
 1st Class (14 February 1918)
 Ritterkreuz II. Klasse des Königlichen Sächsischen Albrechts-Ordens mit Schwertern (14 February 1918)
 Honour Cross of the World War 1914/1918
 Wehrmacht-Dienstauszeichnung 4th to 1st Class
 Clasp of the Iron Cross (1939)
 2nd Class (16 October 1939)
 1st Class (26 November 1939)
 High Seas Fleet Badge
 Destroyer War Badge
 German Cross in Gold on 20 November 1941 as Kapitän zur See on battleship 
 Knight's Cross of the Iron Cross number 106 of the Kriegsmarine on 21 March 1942 as Kapitän zur See and commander of battleship Scharnhorst
 Cross of Merit 1st Class (15 July 1965)

References

Citations

Bibliography

 Dörr, Manfred (1995). Die Ritterkreuzträger der Überwasserstreitkräfte der Kriegsmarine, Band 1: A-K (in German). Osnabrück, Germany: Biblio Verlag. .

External links
 

1895 births
1988 deaths
Military personnel from Kiel
Vice admirals of the Kriegsmarine
Recipients of the Gold German Cross
Recipients of the Knight's Cross of the Iron Cross
Officers Crosses of the Order of Merit of the Federal Republic of Germany
Imperial German Navy personnel of World War I
Reichsmarine personnel
People from the Province of Schleswig-Holstein
Recipients of the clasp to the Iron Cross, 1st class